Rocky Rodent is a video game for Super Nintendo Entertainment System, released in 1993.

Plot and gameplay 
When Rocky begins eating at Pie Face Balboa's restaurant, he unintentionally eats an envelope with Balboa's protection money. As a result, mobsters take Balboa's daughter. Balboa asks Rocky to rescue his daughter, promising him an All-You-Can-Eat buffet for her return.

As Rocky Rodent, the player plays a rodent who must use four various hairstyles to rescue the daughter of the owner of Rocky's favorite eatery. Rocky Rodent is a platform game with six levels with multiple stages, similar to a cross between Sonic the Hedgehog and Super Mario Brothers. Text bubbles appear during cutscenes; making the game look more like a comic book rather than a Saturday morning cartoon.

Notes

References

 Rocky Rodent at GameFAQs
 Rocky Rodent at MobyGames
 Rocky Rodent at SNES Music

1993 video games
Irem games
Platform games
Side-scrolling video games
Super Nintendo Entertainment System games
Super Nintendo Entertainment System-only games
Video games about mice and rats
Video games developed in Japan

Single-player video games